The Sula cuckoo-dove (Turacoena sulaensis), is a species of bird in the family Columbidae.
It is endemic to the Sula Islands and the Banggai Archipelago in Indonesia. Prior to 2016, it was considered a subspecies of the white-faced cuckoo dove.

References

Ng, N.S.R., and F.E. Rheindt. 2016. Species delimitation in the White‑faced Cuckoo‑dove (Turacoena manadensis) based on bioacoustic data. Avian Research 7: 2.

Sula cuckoo-dove
Birds of the Sula Islands
Sula cuckoo-dove